Trommer is a German surname. Notable people with the surname include:

 Rosemerry Wahtola Trommer, American poet
 Wolfgang Trommer (1927–2018), German conductor

German-language surnames
Occupational surnames